Thomas Duckworth may refer to:

 Thomas E. Duckworth (born 1942), American acupuncturist 
 Tommy Duckworth, a fictional character from British television soap opera Coronation Street
 Teddy Duckworth (Thomas Crook Duckworth, 1882–?), English football player and manager